Acrolepiopsis suzukiella is a moth of the family Acrolepiidae. It was described by Shōnen Matsumura in 1931. It is found in Japan.

The wingspan is 9–12 mm.

The larvae feed on Dioscorea species.

References

Moths described in 1931
Acrolepiidae
Moths of Japan